The Revolutionary Army of Kampuchea (RAK) were the Armed Forces of Democratic Kampuchea.

History 
During the Democratic Kampuchea days, the 68,000-member Khmer Rouge-dominated CPNLAF (Cambodian People's National Liberation Armed Forces) force, which completed its conquest of Phnom Penh, Cambodia in April 1975, was renamed the RAK (Revolutionary Army of Kampuchea). This name dated back to the peasant uprising that broke out in the Samlot district of Battambang Province in 1967. Under its long-time commander and then Minister of Defense Son Sen, the RAK had 230 battalions in 35 to 40 regiments and in 12 to 14 brigades. The command structure in units was based on three-person committees in which the political commissar ranked higher than the military commander and his deputy.

Cambodia was divided into zones and special sectors by the RAK, the boundaries of which changed slightly over the years. Within these areas, the RAK's first task was the peremptory execution of former Khmer National Armed Forces (FANK) officers and of their families, without trial or fanfare to eliminate Khmer Rouge enemies. The RAK's next priority was to consolidate into a national army the separate forces that were operating more or less autonomously in the various zones. The Khmer Rouge units were commanded by zonal secretaries who were simultaneously party and military officers, some of whom were said to have manifested "warlord characteristics". Troops from one zone frequently were sent to another zone to enforce discipline. These efforts to discipline zonal secretaries and their dissident or ideologically impure cadres gave rise to the purges that were to decimate RAK ranks, to undermine the morale of the victorious army, and to generate the seeds of rebellion. In this way, the Khmer Rouge used the LAK to sustain and fuel its violent campaign. The Air Force of the Revolutionary Army of Kampuchea was formed in 1977 and disband in 1979.

Organization

Revolutionary Army of Kampuchea 
The Revolutionary Army of Kampuchea was the official name of the army of Democratic Kampuchea during the period of 1975 to 1979, mainly consisting of Khmer Rouge operatives. In 1979 during the Cambodian-Vietnamese war it was reformed into the National Army of Democratic Kampuchea to continue to fight against the People's Army of Vietnam and the new Kampuchean People's Revolutionary Armed Forces.

Revolutionary Navy of Kampuchea 
The Revolutionary Navy of Kampuchea (LNK) under the new Khmer Rouge regime had a backbone force of 17 American-made Swift class patrol boats (seven of which were sunk in May 1975 by U.S. air attack during the Mayaguez incident). Additionally the Navy also possessed 2 submarine chasers E311 and E312 (PC-461-class), 3 LCUs and 1 LCM and a number of small river boats.

Air Force of the Revolutionary Army of Kampuchea 
The Air Force of the Revolutionary Army of Kampuchea (AFLAK) was mainly defunct for the time that Democratic Kampuchea existed. Many aircraft were captured from Khmer Air Force including many western types. During the Mayagüez Incident 5 T-28 Trojan aircraft were destroyed. All aircraft were destroyed or captured in 1979 during the Vietnamese invasion of Cambodia.

Equipment

Infantry weapons

Armored Fighting Vehicles

Artillery

Air defense

Aircraft

Ships

References

Democratic Kampuchea
Military history of Cambodia
Factions of the Third Indochina War